Lieutenant General Howard Douglas Graham  (15 July 1898 – 28 September 1986) was a Canadian Army Officer and former Chief of the General Staff.

Early life
Born in Buffalo, New York, he was raised on a farm in Trenton, Ontario. He was called to the Ontario bar in 1922 and practised law for 17 years in Trenton.  During World War I, he enlisted with the Canadian Militia at age 17 and served with the Canadian Infantry in France, Germany and Belgium. Between the wars, Graham continued in the militia as an officer with The Hastings and Prince Edward Regiment.

World War II and beyond 

With the outbreak of World War II in 1939, Graham went overseas with The Hastings and Prince Edward Regiment as the regimental second-in-command. Later serving as the regimental commanding officer from 1940-1941 and later promoted to Brigadier in command of the 1st Canadian Infantry Brigade, he served in Britain, France, Sicily and Italy. From 1946 to 1948 he was the Senior Canadian Army Liaison Officer and Army Advisor to the Canadian High Commissioner in London. From 1948 to 1950 he was Vice Chief of General Staff of the Canadian Army. From 1951 to 1955 he was the General Officer Commanding Central Command in Canada. From 1955 to 1958 he was the Chief of the General Staff of the Canadian Army. After retiring in 1958, he was Canadian Secretary to the Queen for the Royal Tour of Canada in 1959 and 1967.
From 1961 to 1966, he was president of the Toronto Stock Exchange.

In 1987, his autobiography, Citizen and Soldier: The Memoirs of Lieutenant-General Howard Graham, was published.

Honours
Commander of the Order of the British Empire
Distinguished Service Order (twice)
Officer of the Legion of Honour
Croix de Guerre
Officer of the Legion of Merit of the United States
In 1967, he was made an Officer of the Order of Canada.

References

External links
Order of Canada Citation
 
Generals of World War II

1898 births
1986 deaths
Canadian generals
Lawyers in Ontario
Canadian military personnel of World War I
Canadian Commanders of the Order of the British Empire
Canadian Companions of the Distinguished Service Order
Officers of the Order of Canada
Officers of the Legion of Merit
Officiers of the Légion d'honneur
Recipients of the Croix de Guerre (France)
Canadian Commanders of the Royal Victorian Order
Canadian King's Counsel
Canadian Army personnel of World War II
Commanders of the Canadian Army
Military personnel from New York City
Canadian Militia officers
Hastings and Prince Edward Regiment officers